Jaroslav Olša Jr. is a Czech diplomat whose posts include those of Ambassador to Zimbabwe (2000–2006), South Korea (2008–2014) and the Philippines (2014–2018), and Consul General in Los Angeles (2020–current); author of books on history, art and literature of Asia and Africa. He is also science fiction editor, translator and bibliographer. (see Hobbies). He is also the author of books and articles on history, culture and literature of Asia and Africa and historical relations of the non-European countries with the Czech Lands. He has also widely published about science fiction and edited over a dozen anthologies of Czech and international science fiction. He has published in a wide-range of publications such as Czech edition of National Geographic, Nový Orient (New Orient), Světová literatura (World Literature), Mezinárodní politika (Foreign Policy), Mezinárodní vztahy (International Relations). Contributor to various Czech and foreign-language encyclopedias. He was also a curator of art exhibitions, member of the jury of 2011 Bucheon International Fantastic Film Festival, and initiated numerous cultural exchanges and activities.

Science Fiction 
Since his childhood he liked science fiction. He became active in science fiction fandom in Czechoslovakia in 1983 and soon became one of the driving forces of the unofficial movement. He translated from Polish and English, wrote articles on science fiction and reports. He also attended many science fiction conventions in Poland, Hungary, Yugoslavia, Soviet Union, Britain during the 1980s, including Worldcon in Brighton in 1987. After being introduced by Czech SF writer Josef Nesvadba, he joined WORLD SF and participated in a couple of its meetings, e. g. in Fanano (Italy) in 1986 and Chengdu (China) in 1991. In 1986 he started major Czechoslovak fanzine Ikarie XB named after the most influential Czech SF film Ikarie XB-1. Fanzine saw four yearly issues until 1989, and after the Velvet Revolution turned into the first Czechoslovak/Czech sf monthly magazine Ikarie (published 1990-2010, now published as XB-1) of which he was for a time assistant editor. Together with Alexandre Hlinka he also started a small science fiction publisher - AFSF - which was active until the late 1990s and published more than 70 titles, including such as selections of the best stories by Harry Harrison, or Frederik Pohl, and novels by Robert Silverberg, Robert A. Heinlein, Norman Spinrad, Rudy Rucker, Kim Stanley Robinson and also a few original anthologies of both Anglo-American as International science fiction (see bibliography). 
Olša´s most important role in science fiction studies has been as co-editor of the Czech Encyklopedie literatury science fiction (Encyclopedia of Science Fiction Literature, 1995)with Ondřej Neff, and his chapbook on forgotten Czech-American science fiction writer Miles J. Breuer, also known under Czech version of his name Miloslav J. Breuer. He has also edited about a dozen science fiction anthologies, among them the first anthologies of Czech science fiction in English (published in India), Ndebele, Korean and Japanese. He has contributed to Czech, Polish, Russian, French, German, British and US science fiction publications, also to Locus and Foundation: The Review of Science Fiction; has compiled bibliographies of Czech and Slovak fanzines; and has written entries to Clute´s Encyclopedia of Science Fiction (1993).

Literary Works

Non-fiction 
Czechs and Alaska. From the Heart of Europe to the Northern Edge of America. Praha: Nová vlna - Los Angeles: Consulate General of the Czech Republic in Los Angeles 2021. 55 pp.  (MZV ČR),  (Nová vlna),  (Consulate General of the Czech Republic in Los Angeles). - with Zdeněk Lyčka.
The Amazing Breuer. Early Czech-American Science Fiction Author Miloslav (Miles) J. Breuer (1889–1945). Praha: Nová vlna – Los Angeles: Consulate General of the Czech Republic in Los Angeles 2020. 28 pp.  (MZV ČR),  (Nová vlna),  (Consulate General of the Czech Republic in Los Angeles). – chapbook available online
To the Upper Zambezi. Some 19th Century Notes of Czech Traveller Emil Holub. Praha: Nová vlna 2020. - spolueditor Rob S. Burrett.  (MZV ČR) 
 150 Years of Hidden Ties Between Koreans and Czechs – 체코와의 숨겨진 오랜 인연, 150년의 교류사. Praha: Nová vlna 2020. 160 pp. – hardbound coffee table book produced on the occasion of the 30th anniversary of the Czech-Korean diplomatic relations. 
 Han Hŭng-su – otec československé koreanistiky. Korejský historik ve střední Evropě třicátých a čtyřicátých let 20. století (Han Heung-su: Father of Czechoslovak Korean Studies. Korean Historian in the 1930s and 1940s Central Europe). Praha: Nová vlna 2013. 446 pp.  – co-editor Miriam Löwensteinová.
 The Korean Peninsula after the Armistice as Seen by Czechoslovak Delegates to the Neutral Nations Supervisory Commission 1953–1956. – 정전 후 남과 북. 체코슬로바키아 중립국감독위원단이 본. Seoul: Seoul Museum of History 2013. 291 pp.  – co-editors Jongmin Sa and Seongju Hong. (Introduction available online)
 Czech-Korean Film Encounters. History of interaction between the two cinematographies from the 1930s to today. – 양국간의 영화 상호작용 역사 1930년대부터 현재까지 (Jangkukkanŭi jŏnghwa sanghočakjong jŏksa 1930 njŏntäputchŏ hjŏnčäkkači). Seoul: Korean Film Archive 2013. 47 pp. no ISBN
 1901 photographs of Seoul by Enrique Stanko Vráz and other early Czech travellers´ views of Korea – 1901년 체코인 브라즈의 서울 방문. 체코 여행기들의 서울 이야기. Seoul: Seoul Museum of History 2011. 237 pp.  (SHM) 978-80-7441-001-7 (MZV) – co-editor Kang Hong-bin. (Introduction available online)
 Modern Art of Zimbabwe. – 짐바브웨 현대미술전. Seoul: Korea Foundation Cultural Center 2010. 104 pp. 
 Dějiny Zimbabwe, Zambie a Malawi (History of Zimbabwe, Zambia and Malawi). Praha: Nakladatelství Lidové noviny 2008. 656 pp, . – co-author Otakar Hulec.
 Čtyři generace zimbabwských sochařů (Four Generations of Zimbabwean Sculptors). Praha: Botanická zahrada hl. m. Prahy 2007. 81 pp. .
 Afrika očima českých fotografů (Africa as Seen by Czech Photographers). Praha: České centrum Praha – Ministerstvo zahraničních věcí ČR 2007. 23 pp. No ISBN. – exhibition catalogue (Czech/English/French)
 Stephen Kappata – Zambia – Africa. Jablonec nad Nisou: Karel Pupík 2006. 24 pp. No ISBN. – exhibition catalogue (Czech/English)
 Moderní zimbabwské sochařství (Modern Zimbabwean Sculpture). Praha: Orientální ústav Akademie věd České republiky 2003. 86 pp.  – co-editors Otakar Hulec and Celia Winter-Irving.
 Encyklopedie literatury science fiction (Encyclopedia of Science Fiction Literature). Praha – Jinočany: AFSF – H&H 1995. 555 pp.  (AFSF)  (H&H) – co-editor Ondřej Neff.
 Bibliografie českých a slovenských fanzinů za rok 1988 (Bibliography of Czech and Slovak Fanzines for 1988). Praha: Ústřední kulturní dům železničářů – SFK R. U. R. 1990. 61 pp. – mimeographed, no ISBN
 Bibliografie českých a slovenských fanzinů do roku 1987 (Bibliography of Czech and Slovak Fanzines till 1989) (2 vol.). Praha: Ústřední kulturní dům železničářů – SFK R. U. R. 1988. 56+73 leaves – mimeographed, no ISBN

Anthologies 

 ROBOT100. Povídky (ROBOT100. Stories). Praha: Argo 2020. 395 s.  – co-editor Richard Klíčník. – anthology of original short stories celebrating centenary of "R. U. R." by Karel Čapek, creator of the world "robot"
 Kuřata v hadí kleci. Moderní filipínské povídky (Chicks in a Snake´s Cage. Modern Philippine Short Stories). Praha: Argo 2020. 376 s.  – co-editor Silvie Mitlenerová. – selection of the best contemporary short stories by Philippine writers
 Somtow Sucharitkul: Den v Mallworldu (A Day in Mallworld). Praha: Nová vlna 2019. 114 s.  – co-editor Zdeněk Rampas. – selection of short stories
 Haká. European Speculative Fiction in Filipino. Mandaluyong: Anvil Publishing 2019. 321 s.  – co-editor Julie Nováková. – anthology of European science fiction in Filipino
 Patid. Mga Kontemporaneong Kuwento ng mga Czech at Slovak na Manunulat. Naga City: Ateneo de Naga University Press 2018. 116 s.  – co-editors Edgar de Bruin, Julia Sherwood and Kristian Sendon Cordero. – anthology of contemporary Czech and Slovak short stories in Filipino
 Malikmata. Mga Kuwentong Kababalaghang mula Czech Republic. Naga City: Ateneo de Naga University Press 2018. 114 s.  – co-editor Kristian Sendon Cordero. – anthology of Czech fantastic short stories, legends and fairy tales in Filipino
 チェコＳＦ短編小説集 (Cheko esuefu tanpen shosetsushu)(Selection of Czech Science Fiction). Tokyo: Heibonsha 2018. 402 s.  – co-editor Kiyomi Hirano. – anthology of Czech science fiction in Japanese
 Pagtuod. Mga Sigulanong Europeo sa Minasbate kag Tigaonon. Naga City: Ateneo de Naga University Press 2018. 142 s.  – co-editors Enrique S. Villasis and Clinton D. Abilong. – anthology of European classics from eleven countries in Minasbate and Ticaonon
 Pagkamuot. Mga Binirikol na Usipon Gikan sa Europa. Naga City: Ateneo de Naga University Press 2018. 97 s.  – co-editors Kristian Sendon Cordero and Jusán Villaflor Misolás. – anthology of European classics from thirteen countries in Bikol
 Paglaum. Mga Susumaton nga Europeo ha Waray. Naga City: Ateneo de Naga University Press 2018. 150 s.  – co-editors Jerry B. Grácio and Michael Carlo Villas. – anthology of European classicas from twelve countries in Waray
 Agos: Modern European Writers in Filipino. Mandaluyong: Anvil Publishing 2018. 231 s.  – anthology of modern European writers from twelve countries in Filipino
 Ang Laláking Nakalilipad at Ibá pang mga Kuwentong Czech. Manila: Komisyon sa Wikang Filipino – Pambansang Komisyon para sa Kultura at mga Sining 2017. 252 s.  – co-editor Ivana Bozděchová, Filipino editors Roberto T. Añonuevo and Roland T. Glory. – anthology of Czech literature from the late 19th until the early 21st centuries in Filipino
 Ang Manggagaway. At iba pang kathang-agham at pantasya mula sa gitnang Europa at Pilipinas. Mandaluyong: Visprint 2017. 320 s.  – co-editors Dean Francis Alfar and József Bencze. – anthology of science fiction and fantasy short stories from Visegrad 4 countries (Czech Republic, Hungary, Poland, Slovakia) in Filipino
 Karel Čapek: Lambang ika, kita gabos. Naga City: Ateneo de Naga University Press 2017. 206 s.  – co-editors Kristian Sendon Cordero and Paz Verdades M. Santos – selection of short stories by Karel Čapek in Bikol
 Layag: European Classics in Filipino. Mandaluyong: Anvil Publishing 2017. – anthology of European classics from eleven countries in Filipino
 트로야의 빌라 (Trojaui villa) (Villa in Trója). Seoul: Happy Reading Books 2012. 240 s.  – anthology of Czech classics in Korean
 Pramlok: Cena Karla Čapka za rok 1983. Praha: Netopejr 2012.  – co-editors Přemysl Houžvička and Zdeněk Rampas – anthology of Czech science fiction
 체코 단편소설 걸작선 (Čchekcho tanpjonsusor korčakson). Seoul: Happy Reading Books 2011. – co-editor Ivana Bozděchová – anthology of Czech classics in Korean
 제대로된 시체답게 행동해 (Četelo tön sičchetapke hängtonghä! / Jaedero dueon sichaedabgae hengdonghe). Seoul: Happy Reading Books 2011. 519 s.  – co-editor Park Sang-joon – anthology of Czech science fiction in Korean
 Pramlok: Cena Karla Čapka za rok 1982. Praha: Netopejr 2011. 239 s. . – spolueditoři Přemysl Houžvička a Zdeněk Rampas.- anthology of Czech science fiction
 Nevanji Bayaya nedzimwe nyaya. Nganonyorwa kubva kuCzech. Harare: Zimbabwe Publishing House 2004. 56 s. . – selection of Czech fairy-tales in Shona
 Přivolávač deště. Moderní zimbabwské povídky (The Rainmaker. Modern Zimbabwean Short Stories). Praha: DharmaGaia 2003. . – co-editor Mbongeni Malaba – anthology of Zimbabwean short stories
 Ziyajuluka. Indatshana zabasakhulayo eziphuma kwele Tsheki (Czech). Harare: Zimbabwe Publishing House 2001. 66 s.  – anthology of Czech science fiction in Ndebele
 Experiment se sci-fi (Experiment with Sci-fi). Šumperk: SFK Makropulos 1998. 22 s. No ISBN – anthology of Asian short-short science fiction
 Tunel pod světem. The Best of Frederik Pohl Praha: AFSF 1996. – science fiction
 Zpátky na zemi. The Best of Harry Harrison (writer). Praha: AFSF 1996. 252 s.  – science fiction
 Vampire and other Science Stories from Czech Lands. New Delhi: Star Publication 1994. 160 s. No ISBN – anthology of Czech science fiction in English
 Hvězdy jako bozi (Stars Like Gods). Praha: AFSF 1993. 296 s.  – anthology of Anglo-American science fiction
 Přestřelka na úsvitě. Praha: AFSF 1993. 74 s.  – science fiction anthology
 Světy science fiction (Worlds of Science Fiction). Praha: AFSF 1993. 290 s.  – anthology of science fiction from all over the world
 Stanley G. Weinbaum: Odyssea na Marsu (A Martian Odyssey). Praha: AFSF 1992. 227 s.  – selection of science fiction short stories 
 Srdce technopopu (The Heart of Technopop). Praha: AFSF 1992. 121 s.  – anthology of science fiction

Awards and decorations
2018 *:

 Order of Sikatuna, rank Datu, gold distinction – highest Philippine order, bestowed by H.E. Mr. Rodrigo Duterte, President of the Republic of the Philippines on November 23, 2018

2012 *:

Honorary Citizenship of Seoul – awarded by Hon. Mr. Park Won-soon, Seoul City Mayor on October 29, 2012

2011 *:

The Mark Palmer Prize for Diplomats – received from Hon. Audronius Ažubalis, Minister of Foreign Affairs of the Republic of Lithunania on the 6th Ministerial of the Community of Democracies in Vilnius on July 1, 2011

References 

1964 births
Living people
Charles University alumni